Walter Jean Ganshof van der Meersch (18 May 1900 – 12 September 1993) was a Belgian jurist and lawyer. He competed in the four-man bobsledding event at the 1928 Winter Olympics.

References

External links
 

1900 births
1993 deaths
Belgian male bobsledders
Olympic bobsledders of Belgium
Bobsledders at the 1928 Winter Olympics
Sportspeople from Bruges